Leyzller Jorge Lopes de Araújo (born 29 July 1988), known as Jorge Araújo or simply Araújo, is a Portuguese footballer who plays as a right back or right winger. He also holds an Angolan passport.

Club career
After playing youth football with Atlético Sport Aviação and Atlético Petróleos de Luanda, Araújo signed with F.C. Porto in 2004, finishing his formation and making his senior debut with Worthing F.C. three years later. He only returned to Portugal in May 2010, joining CF Esperança de Lagos, after a brief period at Havant & Waterlooville F.C.

In 2011 summer, Araújo switched teams and countries again, signing for Moldovan National Division side FC Dacia Chișinău. In February of the following year, after appearing in only seven matches, he returned to his country and joined Primeira Liga club S.C. Olhanense.

After a loan stint at S.C. Farense, Araújo was released by Olhanense in January 2013 and moved back to his home country in the following month, signing for C.D. Primeiro de Agosto. In June he went on a trial at Recreativo de Huelva, and signed a two-year deal late in the month.

Araújo made his debut for the Andalusians on 10 November, coming on as a late substitute in a 0–1 home loss against Deportivo de La Coruña in the Segunda División. On 24 January of the following year, after failing to appear in any further matches, he was loaned to Elche CF Ilicitano until June; he subsequently made no appearances for the latter.

In August 2014 Araújo rescinded his link with Recre, and joined Lucena CF in Segunda División B. He rescinded with the club on 13 January of the following year.

After a spell at Desportivo Huíla, he joined Bragantino in Brazil.

References

External links

1988 births
Living people
Footballers from Lisbon
Portuguese footballers
Portuguese sportspeople of Angolan descent
Angolan footballers
Association football defenders
Association football wingers
National League (English football) players
Segunda División players
Segunda División B players
Liga Portugal 2 players
C.D. Huíla players
C.D. Primeiro de Agosto players
Clube Atlético Bragantino players
Elche CF Ilicitano footballers
FC Dacia Chișinău players
Havant & Waterlooville F.C. players
Lucena CF players
Recreativo de Huelva players
S.C. Olhanense players
Worthing F.C. players
Portuguese expatriate footballers
Angolan expatriate footballers
Portuguese expatriate sportspeople in England
Expatriate footballers in England
Expatriate footballers in Moldova
Expatriate footballers in Brazil
Portuguese expatriate sportspeople in Spain
Angolan expatriate sportspeople in Spain
Expatriate footballers in Spain